Gadget Geeks is a British television series that aired on Sky1, and focused on technology and gadgets. The series differed to the Channel 5 series The Gadget Show, in that it did not just feature commercially available technology, but also specially-built items designed by the in-house "geeks" (Tom Scott, Colin Furze, and Charles Yarnold).

The show was commissioned by Sky in 2011. After the show was aired, it was not commissioned for another series.

Format
The show is divided into two sections. One features gadgets and technology that are available commercially. These segments are presented by technology journalists Rory Reid, Ian Morris and Emma Barnett. The other is "builds" where a problem is solved by the three experts creating their own gadgets to help a member of the public with a specific challenge. The builds are presented by Colin Furze, Tom Scott and Charles Yarnold.

Episodes

References

External links

Sky UK original programming
2012 British television series debuts
2012 British television series endings
Television series by Banijay